"Nesian 101" is the first single released by New Zealand group Nesian Mystik from their album  Elevator Musiq. The single was released in 2008, under Bounce/Universal Records.

The song was released as a single in 2008 where it debuted at #36 on the RIANZ New Zealand chart. It later reached #1 on the chart.

The single was certified platinum in New Zealand.

Track listing
"Nesian 101" - 4:43
"Nesian 101" (video)

Chart positions

References

2008 singles
Nesian Mystik songs
Number-one singles in New Zealand
2008 songs